418 Search and Rescue Operational Training Squadron is a unit of the Royal Canadian Air Force, formed during World War II.

History

418 Squadron RCAF was Canada's highest-scoring squadron in World War II, in terms of both air-to-air and air-to-ground kills, and in terms of both day and night operations. The squadron's most active period was 1944, when assigned to Intruder and Ranger sorties across occupied Europe.

The squadron was re-formed in 1946 flying the B-25 Mitchell in the tactical bomber role from the Edmonton Municipal Airport. It moved to RCAF Station Namao in 1955. In 1958, 418 was redesignated as a light transport and search and rescue unit. Aircraft assigned included the de Havilland Canada DHC-3 Otter and Beechcraft C-45 Expeditor from RCAF Station Namao. Its duties ranged from aid to the civil power to aerial resupply.

Upon unification of the forces the squadron converted to the De Havilland Twin Otter. The squadron was disbanded in 1994, and its aircraft were shifted to 440 Transport Squadron in Yellowknife, Northwest Territories. The unit is featured in exhibits at the Alberta Aviation Museum on Kingsway Avenue in Edmonton.

418 Squadron was re-formed on March 13, 2019, with Lieutenant-Colonel Jeffers as commanding officer. The unit is based at 19 Wing Comox, as 418 Search and Rescue Operational Training Squadron, training aircrew and maintenance personnel on the CC-295 Kingfisher, using simulators and aircraft.

Aircraft operated
Douglas Boston III
de Havilland Mosquito Mk. II
de Havilland Mosquito FB Mk VII
North American Harvard Mk II
North American B-25 Mitchell
Beechcraft C-45 Expeditor
Lockheed T-33 Silver Star
de Havilland Canada DHC-3 Otter
de Havilland Canada DHC-6 Twin Otter
CC-295 Kingfisher

References

External links

Squadron history at Canadian Wings

Canadian Article XV squadrons of World War II
Royal Canadian Air Force squadrons
Military units and formations established in the 1940s
Military units and formations established in 2019